The 2020 Women's Herald Sun Tour sponsored by Lexus of Blackburn was a women's cycle stage race held in Victoria, Australia, from 5 to 6 February 2020. The 2020 edition was the third edition of the race and centred around Shepparton and Falls Creek.

Route

Classification leadership table

References

2020 in women's road cycling